The Dwarf Athletic Association of America (DAAA) is an American athletic organization that sponsors and organizes athletic events for people with dwarfism.

History
Founded in 1985, the DAAA's purpose is to develop, promote, and provide little people athletes with organized and quality amateur athletics in a supportive environment. DAAA holds the idea that there is a lack of sports opportunity for little people in America and they look to fill the void and provide an environment that rewards dwarf athletes by taking their potential seriously and giving them a realistic opportunity to succeed through hard work and dedication.  The DAAA also believes that "the dream of honoring America in international competition should be as real for a dwarf athlete as it is for any other in the country."

Mission
According to its website, the DAAA's mission is: "To encourage people with dwarfism to participate in sports regardless of their level of skills." It is also to help dwarfs realize their true potential in life.

Sports and eligibility
The DAAA organizes and promotes dwarf athletics in a variety of sports for a variety of ages.  They also sponsor clinics and development events around the United States.

List of amateur sports
The DAAA has athletes that compete in the following sports:

Track and field
Badminton
Basketball
Boccia
Football
Soccer
Swimming
Table tennis
Weightlifting
Volleyball
Shooting
Archery

Eligibility
Due to the medical nature of dwarfism, the DAAA has certain requirements that must be met for eligibility.  These requirements include (but are not limited to):

Disproportionate dwarves (usually with achondrodysplasia who are less than (or equal to) five feet tall) and proportionate dwarves with a height that is less than or equal to four feet ten inches are usually eligible to compete
All participants must meet a special medical clearance and file a current medical release form (except those participating in Boccia)
All athletes must also sign a "Waiver and Release of Liability and Publicity Release" in order to participate

Events
In addition to the development of youth and adult dwarf athletes, the DAAA also organizes a number of local, regional, and national events to promote healthy competition among other little people.

National Dwarf Games
The National Dwarf Games is a yearly amateur competition organized by the DAAA (and local organizations) and only open to little people.  Athletes are divided on the basis of age, gender, and functional ability classifications.  There are also events for ages 8–15, but these are meant to emphasize the achievement of personal best.  Also, youth seven and under can participate in special (non-competitive) programs where everybody wins.  In 2007, the National Dwarf Games were held in Seattle, Washington, in conjunction with the 2007 Little People of America conference.

World Dwarf Games

The World Dwarf Games are an international competition (similar to the Paralympics) that allows little people to compete at an international level.  The games are held every four years at locations around the world. Athletes that have shown outstanding athleticism during the National Dwarf Games are chosen to participate in the World Dwarf Games.

The World Dwarf Games were first held in Chicago in 1993 and were hosted by the DCCC.  During this inaugural games, the International Dwarf Athletic Federation (IDAF) was conceived.  Since then, the World Dwarf Games have been held every four years at cities around the world. The 2017 World Dwarf Games took place in Guelph, Canada.

 http://worlddwarfgames2017.org/event-history/
 2013 medal table and results : http://www.2013worlddwarfgames.org/index.php/sports/sports-grid.html
 2013 World Dwarf Games consists of almost 400 athletes from 16 countries in 16 sports.
 The 7th World Dwarf Games 2017 – University of Guelph, August 5 to 12, 2017 : http://worlddwarfgames2017.org/

2013 World Dwarf Games

2013 medal table 
 excel version (word version have a few difference)

 MIX - Mixed Country Teams

Participating nations
16 Country:

  (33)
  (5) 
  (1)
  (25)
  (1)
  (2)
  (4)
  (81)
  (1)
  (16)
  (14)
  (3)
  (1)
  (1)
  (1)
  (204)

Sports
16 sports:

  Athletics
  Swimming
  Shooting
  Powerlifting
  Badminton
  Table tennis
  Tennis (Recreation)
  Boccia
  Archery
  Curling (Kurling) *
  Floor hockey 
  Soccer
  Basketball
  Volleyball
  Flag football (Recreation)
  Bass fishing (Recreation)

 Kurling is an modified form of the original curling game, adapted so that it can be played indoors on any smooth, flat surface, like a sports hall, instead of on ice.
 http://www.2013worlddwarfgames.org/index.php/sports/sports-grid.html

2017 World Dwarf Games

2017 medal table 

 http://worlddwarfgames2017.org/medal-count-by-country/

Affiliations
The DAAA maintains affiliations and relationships with the following organizations:
United States Olympic Committee
America's Athletes with Disabilities
United States Disabled Sports Team
International Dwarf Athletic Association
Little People of America
Billy Barty Foundation
Dwarf Sports Association UK

In the media
The DAAA has been featured in a number of episodes on the American television series Little People, Big World on TLC.  The show, centered around the dwarf members of the Roloff family, has included a number of episodes where members of the family have participated in events sponsored by the DAAA. Zach Roloff competes in soccer regularly, and in 2006, Amy competed in Bocce.

See also
Little People of America

References

External links
The Official Website of the Dwarf Athletic Association of America
Mobility International USA profile on the DAAA
Official site of the 2009 World Dwarf Games in Belfast, Northern Ireland

Parasports organizations in the United States
Dwarf sports
1985 establishments in the United States
Sports organizations established in 1985